The following is a list of characters from Princess Connect! Re:Dive.

Guilds & Characters

Gourmet Guild 
Gourmet Guild is a newly founded guild created by Yuuki, Pecorine, Kokkoro, and Karyl. Their goal is to explore Landosol and eat all of the delicacies it has to offer, primarily by accepting quests that have to deal with food. Pecorine is the Guild Master.

A Humanfolk male in the series who serves as the player stand-in in game. In Princess Connect!, Yuuki was a member of Twinkle Wish, but after the world reset that begins Princess Connect! Re:Dive, Yuuki has lost all memories and instead founds the Gourmet Guild guild. While losing most of his memories and has regressed to a simpler mind state, he is kind-hearted and brave. He has a mysterious power granted to him that allows him to empower his allies with tremendous power. In real life, Yuuki is well acquainted with most of the girls of Princess Connect! Re:Dive to a certain extent.
 
, Lili Beaudoin (Dragalia Lost) 
A Humanfolk female who is perpetually hungry and is known to consume large quantities of food, though the anime reveals the reason she is hungry all the time is because her suit of armour grants her great power, but at the expense of constant hunger. Cheerful and kind, she will help anyone in need. In real life, she is an actual princess of a small country that developed Legends of Astrum. She met Yuuki who was one of the few people who treated her normally, despite being a princess. She is sensitive in disclosing her real name to people, preferring to go by the nickname given to her. 
 

An Elvenfolk girl who is assigned by Ameth to watch over Yuuki, whom she affectionately refers to as her Lord. She is soft-spoken and treasures her role in supporting Yuuki in his adventures in Landosol. In real life, Yuuki is the first person to have befriended Kokkoro and has devoted her life to supporting him in both real life and in Legends of Astrum.
 

A Cat Beastfolk girl sent by Mana Senri to assassinate Pecorine. After failing to do so and slowly growing attached to Yuuki, Pecorine, and Kokkoro, she becomes a founding member of Gourmet Guild. She is a tsundere, but is soft-hearted deep down. She is Mana Senri's Princess Knight, a player who is granted a small form of power of one of the Seven Crowns. She can control monsters and spur them into attacking players.
 

A Dragonfolk girl who loses her memories alongside Yuuki in the second Arc of Princess Connect Re:Dive!. In real life, Shefi is a junior Figure Skating champion who plays Legend of Astrum while she is rehabilitating from a skating injury in her leg. Originally, she was unaffiliated with any Guild, but after recovering her memories, she joins Gourmet Guild.

Twinkle Wish
A guild formed by Yui, Hiyori, and Rei that focuses on helping the people of Landosol and has the dream of reaching the top of the Tower of Sol. Hiyori is the Guild Master. 
 

A Humanfolk girl who initially played Legends of Astrum alone until she put a request to form a party of adventurers, leading her to meeting Hiyori and Rei, thus founding Twinkle Wish. Yui is a gentle girl who specializes in healing magic. In real life, she is the classmate of Yuuki, having known him since middle school. Having been bullied by most of her classmates, Yuuki was the only one who treated her kindly, leading her to develop a crush on him but has yet to admit her feelings. This carries over into Legends of Astrum where she has a crush on Yuuki in game as well.
 

A Cat Beastfolk who is energetic, but a bit absentminded. In real life, as a little girl, she met Yuuki one day when she was separated with her mother. After he had helped her reunite with her mother, his kindness left a deep impression on her, thus leading her to help others in need.
 

A Daemonfolk girl who has a cool personality and will do what is just when helping those in need. She has difficulties trusting others outside of her guildmates and is upset when left behind on an adventures despite initially being a solo player prior to forming Twinkle Wish. She also enjoys fishing.

Labyrinth
A mysterious Guild with no clear objective or goals. They are however tied to Yuuki in some manner as most of their members safeguard him in some situations. Labyrista is the Guild Master.
 

A mysterious Humanfolk woman who takes a special interest in Yuuki as his earnest personality rekindled her faith in humanity. She is one of the Seven Crowns and is the one who granted Yuuki his special powers, thus making him her Princess Knight. She also is a crêpe maker, doing so both in Legends of Astrum and in real life where she owns a food truck.
 

Shizuru is a Humanfolk female who has a big sister-type character who is nurturing to those she encounters. She is particularly affectionate with Yuuki whom she claims is her younger brother. In real life, she is the next door neighbor of Yuuki and his childhood friend. While his parents are on a business trip, Shizuru is tasked by his parents in caring for him in their absence, which she takes seriously as his self-proclaimed "big sister".
 

Rino is a Humanfolk female who claims to be Yuuki's little sister. She is energetic and does her best to impress Yuuki, somewhat disliking the fact that she has to watch over him from the shadows. She has difficulty with idioms, either taking such phrases at face value of the words or simply misstates them. In real life, she has known Yuuki since childhood as he would console her whenever she was upset, thus she treats him like he is her big brother.

Carmina
A Japanese idol themed guild in which its members travel around Landosol engaging in show business events and give live performances. Nozomi is the Guild Master.
 

A Humanfolk girl whose dream is to become the Top Idol of Landosol. Despite her popularity as a solo artist, she formed Carmina to make an idol unit. In real life, she is an actual idol whose popularity comes into play in Legends of Astrum due to her in-game appearance being the same as in real life. She is interested in Yuuki as he was the first person in real life and in Legends of Astrum not immediately recognize her and treated her normally.
 

A Humanfolk girl who enjoys writing songs, but has difficulty singing in front of others despite her great singing voice.
 

A Humanfolk girl who idolizes Rei and is jealous of Yuuki due to his close relationship with Rei. She enjoys making clothes. In real life she is an underclassman of Rei at their school.

Little Lyrical
An unofficial guild formed by three girls who are too young to officially establish a guild. Their primary objective is to go on adventures and have fun. Mimi is the Guild Master
 

A Beastfolk girl who is themed with bunny accessories, though her precise beast race is unknown. She has a "fluffy" personality and lives life guilelessly. She gets lost easily, is distracted by cute things, and enjoys making up songs that she sings. 
 

A Humanfolk girl who enjoys playing pranks on others and going on adventures with her guildmates.
 

An Elvenfolk girl who is reliable and responsible for her age, but also possesses a bit of a sharp tongue.

Forestier
A guild of Elf-Race girls who preserves medicinal plants in the Elves Forest and occasionally acts as guides. Misato is the guild master.
 

An Elvenfolk girl who desires to make friends, but due to her shy personality, has trouble doing so. Yuuki is one of the first people to approach her and befriend her in Legends of Astrum and in real life. She dubs their friendship as BB Team.
 

An Elvenfolk woman who has a motherly personality. Her "gentle power" can soothe and tame even monsters in Legends of Astrum. She is a child-care worker in real life and sometimes treats Yuuki like a young boy in game and in real life.
 

An Elvenfolk girl with supernatural powers of telekinesis and teleportation that she chooses to hide. She is sometimes sleepy as a result of using her powers. Normally, Hatsune has a bubbly personality and is full of energy, sometimes punctuating her sentences with "Kira~n". She is the older sister of Shiori in Legends of Astrum and in real life, whom she has a soft spot for and uses her powers to help cover.

Diabolos
A guild composed of girls of the Fiend-Race. The guild is named after Ilya's former army when battling the Gods of the past. Ilya is the Guild Master
 

A Daemonfolk girl who is a vampire in real life. She desires to conquer the world, but has lost most of her powers over the centuries. Her normal form is that of a young girl, though at full power, such as when she is empowered by Yuuki's powers, she takes on the appearance of a mature woman until the power wears off. As such, she values Yuuki as a subordinate and a means to reclaim her former glory.
 

A Daemonfolk girl with a calm and reserved personality. She is accompanied by a "skull father" who is cruel and manipulative to go on dates with young girls, yet deeply cares for Shinobu. She enjoys fortune telling, though her skull father is the one who does the act.
 

A Daemonfolk girl and the younger twin sister of Yori. She acts spoiled, but is adored by everyone nonetheless.
 

A Daemonfolk girl and the older twin sister of Akari. She is shy girl who has difficulties speaking up and often apologizes when she feels she has inconvenienced someone, even when not warranted.
 

A Daemonfolk girl and a ghost. Miyako is obsessed with pudding and relentlessly seeks it. She haunts Yuuki among others to give her pudding, though he is one of the few people who can see her and genuinely assists her in securing pudding.

Nightmare, Defenders of the Throne 
A guild dedicated to protecting the throne of Landosol and leaders of the palace knights. Jun is the Guild Master.
 

A Humanfolk woman who wears heavy knight armor that obscures her face that is only seen in very rare instances, even in real life. She takes her job as the captain of the palace knights seriously, but enjoys whenever Yuuki visits her on duty. In real life, Jun works at a theme park as a Tokusatsu masked hero for the park's entertainment.
 / 

A Humanfolk woman former member of NIGHTMARE though still has some association to the guild and is one of the Seven Crowns. She is impulsive and often desires to fight strong opponents, often to negative effect to her surroundings. She is an idol producer for Carmina.
 

A Humanfolk girl who is a new-recruit for NIGHTMARE. She treasures her friends and enjoys teasing other people for her amusement. In real life she practices Kendo under the tutelage of her grandfather which her real life fighting style transfers into Legends of Astrum.
 

A Beastfolk tiger girl who is a new apprentice for NIGHTMARE. She enjoys acting like a hero.

Sarendia Orphanage
A guild that also doubles as an orphanage and deals with trade. Saren is the Guild Master.
 

An Elvenfolk girl who is a former member of NIGHTMARE before establishing Sarendia in order to better serve the people. In real life, Yuuki is a childhood friend of Saren when her family was once impoverished, having defended her from bullies. She became more assertive as a result as to not burden him and maintains a friendship with him even after her family became wealthy. She remains humble and knows the full value of money and wisely uses it to support her goals.
 

A Humanfolk girl and Saren's maid. She is devoted to serving Saren but her clumsiness often causes mishaps, though Saren greatly appreciates her effort.
 

A Humanfolk girl who is accompanied by her beloved bear plush, Puukichi. She treats Yuuki like an older brother.
 

A Humanfolk girl who is a shrinking violet type of girl. She has difficulty being looked at and goes to great lengths to avoid drawing attention. Yuuki is one of the few people she is comfortable being around to an extent.

Caon
A guild of Beast-Race girls who protect Animal Garden comerades from demons. Maho is the Guild Master.
 

A Beastfolk fox girl who believes that she is the princess of the Maho Maho Kingdom. She sews plushies as a hobby and has a massive collection of plushies she has made or "rescued" from stores/arcades. She is acquainted with Yuuki in real life and refers to him in Legends of Astrum and in real life as her prince due to playing along with her fantasies.
 

A Beastfolk wolf girl who is tomboyish and loves to fight. She is best friends with Yui in Legends of Astrum and in real life. She is also her classmate as well as Yuuki. She is well aware of Yui's feelings for Yuuki and assists her in creating situations for the two to grow closer and have her friend confess, much to Yui's often embarrassment.
 

A Beastfolk doberman girl who has excellent deductive skills and wants to be a detective. In real life, she is the underclassmen of Yuuki and he is one of her few friends as she tends to be a loner otherwise.
 

A Beastfolk Ryukyu Inu girl who goes with the flow of things and believes that everything works out in the end. Her carefree approach to life often causes her to miss important details, but her energy and enthusiasm makes her well loved. In real life she hails from Okinawa and she loves Okinawan cultural practices and items native to her home.

Elizabeth Park
A farming guild that raises cows and chickens. Their guildhouse is a popular tourist destination. Mahiru is the Guild Master.
 

A Humanfolk female who enjoys farming and making jokes. In real life she grew up on a farm and helps her family.

A Beastfolk llama who loves pretty things and likes to dress fashionably. She receives an apple from a mysterious benefactor that temporarily gives her a more human form. In real life, she is an actual llama who desires to be a real girl. She is acquainted with Yuuki though he and many others cannot understand her since she can only say "Rima" outside of Legends of Astrum. Eventually Yuuki is able to understand some of her feelings, but still does not know what she is saying in real life.
 

A Beastfolk squirrel girl who is lazy and spends most of her time either sleeping or collecting acorns. She is not a member of a particular guild, but she primarily spends her time at Elizabeth Park more than any other guild.
 

A Beastfolk white tiger girl who is calm and reserved, but has a sickly constitution. As a result she joined Elizabeth Park due to the ideal conditions in maintaining her health. In Legends of Astrum and in real life, she is the younger sister of Hatsune who she loves dearly.

Mercurius Foundation
A guild that finances businesses across Landosol, providing loans and mortgages. Secretly their mission is to punish illegal businesses. Akino is the Guild Master.
 

 

 

A Cat Beastfolk woman who fights strong to protect the weak. She has a soft spot for Taiyaki

Twilight Caravan
A mysterious guild known for taking particularly dangerous quests. Most of its members have a dubious reputation in Landosol. Ruka is the Guild Master.
 

 

 

A Daemonfolk girl who has an obsession with Yuuki due to believing that he is her soulmate. She has yandere traits and will punish anyone who impedes on her attempts to secure Yuuki. She also has a soft spot for children and is nuturing to them.
 

A Daemonfolk girl who is an Otaku in real life. Her speech heavily uses internet speech and tends to shout grandiose phrases when in combat. She is a fan of magical girl anime and manga. She has known Yuuki since grade school, sharing the same "hardcore gaming" interests.
 

A Daemonfolk girl with a chunibyo personality. She refers to Yuuki as Sigurd.

Lucent Academy 
A guild that doubles is also a notable Academy in Landosol. Io is the Guild Master.
 

A Daemonfolk woman who charms people due to her unintentionally flirty personality. In real life, she is Yuuki's homeroom teacher and is a bit of an airhead. Despite her innocent intentions, her doting on Yuuki has caused him to be the target of ire for the other boys in his class due to Io treating him special.
 

A Daemonfolk girl who is a professional model in Legends of Astrum and in real life. Though she is fashionable, she is not academically gifted, scoring the lowest out of everyone at the Academy. She speaks in a Gyaru fashion.
 

A Daemonfolk girl who tends to act older than she actually is and dislikes being treated like a child. She especially enjoys being treated and acting like royalty, but does feel remorseful if she feels she has gone to far with her act.

Weissflügel (Landosol Branch) 
A guild that helps out people in need and is noted for magnificently completing quests, even in a pinch. Monika is the Guild Master.

A Humanfolk female from another world who hates to be treated like a child due to her appearance. She is originally from Rage of Bahamut, another Cygames game.

A Humanfolk female who is obsessed with Japanese culture and models her fighting style and habits of ninjas. In real life, she is originally from France and has a skewed view of Japanese culture due to basing it off of anime and related media. She speaks with a western accent.
 

A Humanfolk female who is a masochist. She mistakenly believes Yuuki is a sadist and calls him "Mr. Sadist". She often has extreme fantasies of the acts of sadism that Yuuki ultimately does not do.
 

An Elvenfolk male who dresses femininely and is obsessed with beauty.
 

An Elvenfolk female who is interested in Yuuki, but watches him from a distance as she is too shy to approach him. She has very little presence with most people not noticing her even if they are standing near her.

St. Theresa's Academy (Friendship Club) 
With the goal of securing a hefty scholarship, this school club guild was formed on a whim by its members in an attempt to prove their sociable nature.

Dragon's Nest
A guild of dragon-race players who are searching for real dragons. Homare is the Guild Master.
 

A Dragon-Race woman rumored to be one of the Seven Crowns, a rumor she does not confirm or deny.

Richmond Commerce Association
 /

Rage Legion

Others
	

Ameth is a former Guide Fairy who accompanied Yuuki and the members of Twinkle Wish under the name Fio prior to the world reset at the end of the events of Princess Connect! Having lost her ability to guide Yuuki, she instead works on restoring Landosol back to normal and helping Yuuki regain his memories.

Guest Characters

A humanfolk girl from another world who is not affiliated with any guild. In real life, she is a new student at Yuuki's school and is in his class. She is from another Cygames mobile game, Granblue Fantasy.

An elvenfolk girl from another world who came to Landosol in search of her friend Losaria. She is from another Cygames mobile game, Shadowverse.

Twin Flowers of Astrum

Collaboration Characters

Re:Zero Sharing Lunch in Another World

References

Princess Connect! Re:Dive